Diringsiella femoralis is a species of beetle in the family Cerambycidae. It was described by Martins and Galileo in 1991.

References

Dodecosini
Beetles described in 1991